GNPC may refer to:
 Glass Nickel Pizza Company, Italian restaurant based in Madison, Wisconsin
 Ghana National Petroleum Corporation (GNPC), state agency responsible for petroleum-related activities in Ghana.
 Glassile Nurayum Platile Curryum (GNPC), Indian secret Facebook group